The 1971–72 Virginia Squires season was the second season of the Virginia Squires in the American Basketball Association. This was the debut season of future Hall of Famer Julius Erving. In the first half of the season, the Squires were 26–16, with a season-high five-game losing streak and one five-game winning streak in that half. In the second half, they went 19–23. The Squires finished 2nd in points scored at 118.9 per game, but 9th in points allowed at 118.0 per game. Just before the season ended, Charlie Scott left the team and joined the NBA's Phoenix Suns, completing a trade with the Boston Celtics (who held his original draft rights) for Paul Silas. Scott set the all-time ABA individual single-season scoring record by averaging 34.6 points per game. In the playoffs, the Squires swept the Floridians (with Game 2 even being broadcast on CBS), but the Squires lost to the New York Nets in the Division Finals. After the season, the Squires stopped playing in Roanoke, electing to focus on Norfolk, Hampton, and Richmond only.

Roster 
16 Bill Bunting – Small forward 
42 Jim Eakins – Center
32 Julius Erving – Small forward 
30 George Irvine – Small forward 
24 Neil Johnson – Power forward
34 Mike Maloy – Power forward 
15 Doug Moe – Small forward 
21 Dana Pagett – Guard 
33 Charlie Scott – Shooting guard 
22 Ray Scott – Power forward 
10 Adrian Smith – Shooting guard 
35 Willie Sojourner – Center
14 Roland Taylor – PG
11 Bernie Williams – Shooting guard

Final standings

Eastern Division

Playoffs
Eastern Division Semifinals

Squires win series, 4–0

Eastern Division Finals vs. New York Nets

Squires lose series, 4–3

Awards and honors
1972 ABA All-Star Game selections (game played on January 29, 1972) 
Julius Erving
Charlie Scott

References

 Squires on Basketball Reference

External links
 RememberTheABA.com 1971–72 regular season and playoff results
 Virginia Squires page

Virginia Squires
Virginia Squires
Virginia Squires, 1971–72
Virginia Squires, 1971–72